Mariano Barbasán Lagueruela (3 February 1864 – 22 July 1924) was a Spanish painter of genre scenes and cityscapes in the Realist style; later influenced by Impressionism.

Biography 
He was born in Zaragoza. From 1880 to 1887, he attended the Real Academia de Bellas Artes de San Carlos in Valencia). Upon graduating, he moved to  Madrid and became a historical painter; specializing in scenes from the history of Toledo, which he visited frequently. He also did some scenes from literature and presented his rendering of the Walpurgisnacht of Faust at the National Exhibition of Fine Arts.

In 1889, thanks to his painting "Joseph Interpreting the Cup-bearer's Dream", he received a stipend from the "" to continue his studies at the :es:Academia de España en Roma (Spanish Academy in Rome). While there, he painted mostly landscapes and scenes of rural life.

He eventually decided to live there and opened a studio; making occasional trips to Subiaco and Anticoli Corrado to paint en plein aire. He held frequent exhibits throughout Germany, Austria and England, but not in Spain, as a result of which he was little-known in his home country. In 1912, he lived in Montevideo for a short time while overseeing two exhibitions there.

He stayed in Rome until 1921, when his health began to worsen. Returning to Spain, he took a chair at the "Academia de Bellas Artes de San Luis" in Zaragoza, which had recently become vacant due to the death of Francisco Pradilla. It was two years later that he held his first retrospective exhibition, at the Central Market in Zaragoza. He died in Zaragoza, aged 60.

In 1925, his son organized a new, more formal exhibition that helped establish his reputation in Spain.

Selected paintings

References

Further reading
Caja Rural de Aragón, Mariano Barbasán. 1864-1924 (exhibition catalog) Cajalón, 1995

External links 

ArtNet: More works by Barbasán.

1864 births
1924 deaths
19th-century Spanish painters
19th-century Spanish male artists
Spanish male painters
20th-century Spanish painters
20th-century Spanish male artists
Orientalist painters
People from Zaragoza
Spanish landscape painters
Spanish genre painters
Spanish emigrants to Italy
Landscape painters